The Roman Catholic Diocese of Garissa is a diocese located in the city of Garissa. It is administered under the Ecclesiastical province of Mombasa in Kenya.

History
 December 9, 1976: Established as Apostolic Prefecture of Garissa from the Diocese of Mombasa and Diocese of Meru 
 February 3, 1984: Promoted as Diocese of Garissa

Bishops
 Prefects Apostolic of Garissa (Roman rite) 
 Fr. Leo White, O.F.M. Cap. (December 9, 1976 – 1984)
 Bishops of Garissa (Roman rite)
 Bishop Paul Darmanin, O.F.M. Cap. (February 3, 1984 - 9 Dec 2015)
 Bishop Joseph Alessandro, O.F.M. Cap. (9 Dec 2015 - Present)

Coadjutor Bishop
Joseph Alessandro, O.F.M. Cap. (2012-2015)

See also
Roman Catholicism in Kenya

Sources
 GCatholic.org
 Catholic Hierarchy
Kenya Conference of Catholic Bishops 
Archdiocese of Mombasa 

Garissa
Roman Catholic dioceses in Kenya
Christian organizations established in 1976
Roman Catholic dioceses and prelatures established in the 20th century
1976 establishments in Kenya
Roman Catholic Ecclesiastical Province of Mombasa